USS Percival (DD-298) was a  built for the United States Navy during World War I.

Description
The Clemson class was a repeat of the preceding  although more fuel capacity was added. They had a crew of 6 officers and 108 enlisted men.

Performance differed radically between the ships of the class, often due to poor workmanship. The Clemson class was powered by two steam turbines, each driving one propeller shaft, using steam provided by four water-tube boilers.

The ships were armed with four 4-inch (102 mm) guns in single mounts and were fitted with two  1-pounder guns for anti-aircraft defense. In many ships a shortage of 1-pounders caused them to be replaced by 3-inch (76 mm) guns. Their primary weapon, though, was their torpedo battery of a dozen 21 inch (533 mm) torpedo tubes in four triple mounts. They also carried a pair of depth charge rails. A "Y-gun" depth charge thrower was added to many ships.

Construction and career
Percival, named for John Percival, was launched 5 December 1918 by the Bethlehem Shipbuilding Corporation, San Francisco, California; sponsored by Miss Eleanor Wartsbaugh; and commissioned 1 March 1920, Commander Raymond A. Spruance, who was to lead the US 5th Fleet in World War II, in command. With trials off the California coast completed, Percival reported for duty with Squadron 4 Flotilla 5 of the Cruiser Destroyer Force Pacific based at San Diego, California. On 8 September 1923, the ship was involved in the Honda Point Disaster, and a few days later, she became flagship of Squadron 11 and made annual deployments with the Pacific Battle Fleet in fleet problems.

Percival was decommissioned 26 April 1930 and scrapped in 1931.

Notes

References

External links
http://www.navsource.org/archives/05/298.htm

 

Clemson-class destroyers
Ships built in San Francisco
1918 ships